CIN - Corporação Industrial do Norte S.A. is a Portuguese company that is the Iberian market leader for paint & coating products. The company was established in 1926 and is headquartered in Maia, Norte Region.

In 1990 CIN became a member of the Coatings Research Group Inc. (CRGI) in Cleveland, Ohio, USA, a group that tests innovative prime materials, products and technology in the paint industry for the construction segment.

Companies
The main companies in the CIN Group are:

Nitin
Lacose-Sotinco
Tintas Cin Açores
Tintas Cin Madeira
Barnices Valentine
Tintas Cin de Angola
Pinturas Cin Canarias
Boero Bartolomeo Spa
Tintas Cin de Moçambique

References

External links
Official Website
Sơn Nước Xây Dựng

Paint and coatings companies of Portugal